Ottakoru Kaamukan is a 2018 Indian Malayalam-language romantic drama film directed by debutantes Ajinlal and Jayan Vannery and stars Shine Tom Chacko, debutante Arundhati Nair, Lijomol Jose, Shalu Rahim, Joju George and Abhirami.

Cast 

Shine Tom Chacko as Vinu
Arundhati Nair as Annie 
Lijomol Jose as Kathrina 
Shalu Rahim as Dominique 
Joju George as Anantakrishnan 
Abhirami as Meera
Vijayaraghavan as Paulose 
Kalabhavan Shajohn as Firoz Khan 
Bhagath Manuel as Leon Joseph 
Balachandran Chullikkadu as older Dominic
Chembil Ashokan as matrimonial advertisement girl's father
Shaheen Siddique as Rahul Rajashekaran
Dain Davis as Josekutty
Manesh Krishnan
Manu M. Lal
Tosh Christy
Sreejith Kottarakkara
Sanjay Pal
Nimi Manuel
 Meera Nair

Production 
The film showcases several love stories: Shine Tom Chacko and Arundhati Nair, Joju George and Abhiramai, and Shahul Rahul and Lijomol Jose.

Soundtrack 
The songs are composed by Vishnu Mohan Sithara. The first song "Aathmaavil" features Shalu Rahim and Lijomol Jose falling in love on various osscasions including at church and at school. The second song "Vennila Kathiro" depicts love between Shine Tom Chacko and Arundhati Nair, who are a couple in the film.

Reception 
The Times of India gave the film a rating of two-and-a-half out of five stars and wrote that "Through Ottakkoru Kamukan, Shine Tom Chacko along with its directors Ajinlal and Jayan have offered a romantic trip that is drenched with rooted-to-reality love stories".

References

External links 

Indian romantic drama films
2018 romantic drama films